Dichagyris exacta is a moth of the family Noctuidae. It is endemic to the Russian plain.

External links
Noctuinae (Noctuidae) collection of Siberian Zoological Museum

exacta
Moths described in 1888